"Homegrown Honey" is a song recorded by American country music artist Darius Rucker. It was released in August 2014 as the first single from his fifth studio album. The album, Southern Style, was released on March 31, 2015. Rucker wrote the song with Charles Kelley of Lady Antebellum and Nathan Chapman.

Critical reception
The song received a favorable review from Taste of Country, which called it a "feel-good melody" which "lives up to expectations." It went on to say that the song is "consistent with what Rucker has released since debuting as a full-time country artist in 2008" and "his vocals stand out above all other instruments, stamping an undeniable signature on this country cut." Paul Bowers of Charleston City Paper also gave the song a favorable review. Bowers called it "classic feel-good Rucker," writing that "he's got that country drawl down pat without trying too hard, he's consistently writing catchy summer anthems like this one, and he's just a nice dude by all accounts."

Commercial performance
"Homegrown Honey" debuted at number 55 on the U.S. Billboard Country Airplay chart for the week of August 30, 2014. It also debuted at number 25 on the U.S. Billboard Hot Country Songs chart for the week of September 13, 2014. It also debuted at number 97 on the U.S. Billboard Hot 100 chart for the week of November 22, 2014.  As of April 2015, the song has sold 376,000 copies in the US.

The song debuted at number 50 on the Canada Country chart for the week of October 18, 2014. It also debuted at number 76 on the Canadian Hot 100 chart for the week of September 13, 2014.

Music video
A music video was shot in Conway, South Carolina in August 2014, filmed primarily at Coastal Carolina University, with the beginning bar scene shot at Rivertown Bistro in Conway. The video features scenes of a woman in a bar, Rucker in a hallway surrounded by fans, as well as the band playing their concert at the school.

Charts

Year-end charts

Certifications

References

2014 songs
2014 singles
Darius Rucker songs
Capitol Records Nashville singles
Songs written by Darius Rucker
Songs written by Charles Kelley
Songs written by Nathan Chapman (record producer)
Song recordings produced by Frank Rogers (record producer)